The men's 500 metres races of the 2015–16 ISU Speed Skating World Cup 2, arranged in the Utah Olympic Oval, in Salt Lake City, United States, was held on November 20 and 22, 2015.

Pavel Kulizhnikov of Russia won race one on a new world record, while Mitchell Whitmore of the United States came second, and William Dutton of Canada came third. Alexandre St-Jean of Canada won the first Division B race.

Kulizhnikov also won race two, with Dutton in second place, and Laurent Dubreuil of Canada in third. Kim Tae-yun of South Korea won the second Division B race.

Race 1
Race one took place on Friday, November 20, with Division B scheduled in the morning session, at 11:04, and Division A scheduled in the afternoon session, at 14:35.

Division A

Note: WR = world record, NR = national record.

Division B

Note: NR = national record.

Race 2
Race two took place on Sunday, November 22, with Division B scheduled at 09:50, and Division A scheduled at 13:35.

Division A

Note: NR = national record.

Division B

Note: NR = national record.

References

Men 00500
2